Michael Winterbottom (born 29 March 1961) is an English film director. He began his career working in British television before moving into features. Three of his films—Welcome to Sarajevo, Wonderland and 24 Hour Party People—have competed for the Palme d'Or at the Cannes Film Festival.

Winterbottom often works with the same actors; many faces can be seen in several of his films, including Shirley Henderson, Paul Popplewell, John Simm, Steve Coogan, Rob Brydon, Raymond Waring and Kieran O'Brien. His production company is Revolution Films and the company signed a first look deal with Fremantle.

Early life
Winterbottom was born in Blackburn, Lancashire. He went to Queen Elizabeth's Grammar School, Blackburn, and then studied English at Balliol College, Oxford, before going to film school at Bristol University, where his contemporaries included Marc Evans.

Career

Early television career
Winterbottom's television directing career began with a documentary about Ingmar Bergman and an episode of the children's series Dramarama in 1989. He followed this with the television film Forget About Me in 1990, starring Ewen Bremner, which followed two British soldiers who become involved in a love triangle with a young Hungarian hitch-hiker on their way to Budapest for a Simple Minds concert.

In 1991, he directed episodes of various British TV shows, including the four-part children's series Time Riders and an episode of Boon.

In 1992, he directed the television film Under the Sun about a young British woman traveling in Greece, starring Kate Hardie.

In 1993, he directed an episode of the Inspector Alleyn Mysteries; Love Lies Bleeding, a television film written by Ronan Bennett about a convicted IRA member on a 24-hour home leave from prison in Belfast; and  The Mad Woman in the Attic, the pilot of Jimmy McGovern's mystery series Cracker.

He next directed the 1994 mini-series Family, written by Roddy Doyle. Each of four episodes focused on one member of a working-class Dublin family. It was this series that first brought Winterbottom to the attention of filmgoers, when it was edited down into a feature and shown at festivals.

His final early television project was a 1995 episode of the documentary series Cinema Europe: The Other Hollywood, focusing on Scandinavian silent cinema.

Film

Butterfly Kiss
Winterbottom's 1995 cinematic debut firmly established his intense visual sense, naturalistic style and compelling use of pop songs to reinforce narrative. The story of a mentally unbalanced lesbian serial killer and her submissive lover/accomplice falling in love as they slaughter their way across the motorways of Northern England. It found only a limited release.

Go Now
That same year, he reunited with Jimmy McGovern for the BBC television film Go Now, the story of a young man who falls ill with multiple sclerosis just as he meets the love of his life. Focusing on the turmoil this causes the couple, the film was given a theatrical release in many countries, including the United States.

Jude
In 1996, Winterbottom adapted his favourite novel, Thomas Hardy's bleak classic Jude the Obscure, the tale of forbidden love between two cousins which had so scandalized British society on its release in 1895 that Hardy gave up novel-writing. It was not Winterbottom's first time approaching the work, having already filmed the pig slaughter sequence at film school. Starring Christopher Eccleston and Kate Winslet, Jude brought Winterbottom wider recognition, his first screening at Cannes and numerous Hollywood offers, all of which he eventually turned down.

Welcome to Sarajevo
Welcome to Sarajevo was filmed on location in the titular city, mere months after the Siege of Sarajevo had ended, adding greatly to its sense of authenticity and allowing frequent inter-cutting of actual news footage from the combat. The film is based on the true story of British reporter, Michael Nicholson, who spirited a young orphan girl out of the war zone to safety in Britain.

I Want You
Winterbottom's next two films both had distribution difficulties and were not widely seen. I Want You is a neo-noir sex thriller set in a decaying British seaside resort town. Starring Rachel Weisz and Alessandro Nivola, it was shot in bold primary colors by the Polish cinematographer Sławomir Idziak and was inspired by the Elvis Costello song of the same name. Idziak won an Honourable Mention award at the 48th Berlin International Film Festival for his work on the film.

With or Without You
With or Without You, starring Christopher Eccleston, is a light Belfast-set sex comedy about a couple who are trying desperately to conceive, only for each to have past loves re-enter their lives.

Wonderland
1999's Wonderland marked a decided shift in style for Winterbottom, with its loose, handheld photography and naturalistic, often improvised dialogue which drew comparisons to Robert Altman. Starring Gina McKee, Shirley Henderson, Molly Parker, John Simm, Ian Hart and Stuart Townsend, it is the story of three sisters and their extended family over Guy Fawkes Day weekend in London. The disparate elements are tied together by an orchestral score by minimalist composer Michael Nyman, who would become a frequent collaborator with Winterbottom.

The Claim
Winterbottom followed that project up with his biggest budgeted film, The Claim, an adaptation of Thomas Hardy's The Mayor of Casterbridge set in 1860s California. Shot with a budget of $20 million in the wilds of Canada, it was not a financial success and proved an ordeal to make, with Winterbottom himself getting frostbite. The production had previously been ready to shoot in Spain, with sets already built, when financing fell through. Attempts were made to cast Madonna, in a role eventually played by Milla Jovovich and many of the production details and difficulties were explained to the public on an unusually frank official website.

24 Hour Party People
24 Hour Party People documents the anarchic, drug and sex-fuelled rise and fall of the influential label Factory Records and the music scene in Manchester from the late 1970s to the mid-1990s. As much an ode to the city of Manchester as the story of the contemporary musical world, the film stars Steve Coogan as broadcaster/music-mogul Tony Wilson.

In This World
His 2002 film In This World depicts the harrowing journey of two Afghan refugees from Pakistan, across the Middle East and Europe to Britain which they try to enter with the help of people smugglers. Shot on digital video with non-professional actors who virtually lived out the events of the film, its compelling sense of reality brought Winterbottom numerous awards including a Golden Bear and a BAFTA for best film not in the English language.

Code 46
The futuristic romantic mystery Code 46 is a retelling of the Oedipus myth, in a world where cloning has created people so interrelated that strict laws (the Code 46 of the title) govern human reproduction. Essentially a film noir, it follows a fraud investigator played by Tim Robbins as he investigates a femme fatale played by Samantha Morton. The film's highly stylized settings were created on a limited budget by taking the tiny crew around the world, shooting in places which already looked like one hundred years in the future. Much of the film was shot in Shanghai, while Dubai and Rajasthan in India were also variously mixed to create a multi-ethnic melting-pot culture.

9 Songs
9 Songs, released in 2004, gained attention as the most sexually explicit film ever to receive a certificate for general release in the UK. It charts a year-long relationship between two lovers, almost exclusively through their sexual interaction and various rock concerts the couple attend. During these concerts, the nine songs of the film's title often comment on the couple's relationship. The film became notorious in the UK for its candid scenes of unsimulated sex between the leads, Kieran O'Brien and Margo Stilley.

A Cock and Bull Story
He followed that with 2006's A Cock and Bull Story, which was released in the United States and Australia as Tristram Shandy: A Cock and Bull Story. It is an adaptation of the famously "unfilmable" The Life and Opinions of Tristram Shandy, Gentleman, one of the earliest novels. Shandy is a narrator so easily distracted in relating his life story that by the end of the book he has not yet come to his own birth. The film, similarly, is about the making of a film of Tristram Shandy, and the impossibility of that task. Moreover, it deals with the impossibility of capturing the complexity of life in a work of art, but the value of the attempt. Steve Coogan stars as himself and as Shandy. The film also marked the end of Winterbottom's lengthy collaboration with writer Frank Cottrell Boyce, who chose to be credited under the pseudonym Martin Hardy.

The Road to Guantanamo
Winterbottom's The Road to Guantanamo is a docu-drama about the "Tipton Three", three British Muslims captured by US forces in Afghanistan who spent two years as prisoners at the Guantanamo Bay detention camp as alleged enemy combatants. It was shot in Afghanistan, Pakistan, and Iran (which doubled for Cuba) in the autumn of 2005. It premiered at the Berlinale on 14 February 2006. It debuted in the UK on television, on 9 March, as it was co-financed by Channel 4.

A Mighty Heart
A Mighty Heart is based on the book by Mariane Pearl, wife of murdered journalist Daniel Pearl. The film stars Angelina Jolie and focuses on the pregnant Mariane's search for her missing husband in Pakistan in 2002. Produced by Jolie's partner Brad Pitt, it was shot in the autumn of 2006 in India, Pakistan and France and premiered out of competition at the 2007 Cannes Film Festival on 21 May 2007.

Genova
Genova is a family drama about an Englishman, played by Colin Firth, who moves his two American daughters to Italy following the death of his wife. Once there, the oldest girl starts exploring her sexuality, while the younger girl begins to see the ghost of her mother. It co-stars Catherine Keener and Hope Davis and was filmed in the titular city of Genoa, Italy, during the summer of 2007. It was written by Wonderland screenwriter Laurence Coriat. It premiered at the 2008 Toronto Film Festival and Winterbottom later won the Silver Shell for best director at the San Sebastian International Film Festival.

The Shock Doctrine
Winterbottom was reunited with his The Road to Guantanamo co-director Mat Whitecross on a documentary based on Naomi Klein's bestselling book The Shock Doctrine. The film follows the use of upheavals and disasters by various governments as a cover for the implementation of free market economic policies that benefit only an elite few. Klein at first disowned the film after learning that it would be composed almost entirely of period footage and narration, with virtually no interview material with sources. The film premiered at the 2009 Berlin Film Festival and aired in the UK on Channel 4's More4 documentary channel on 1 September 2009. It made its American premiere at the 2010 Sundance Film Festival, alongside Winterbottom's following film. At the festival, Klein, who had reconciled herself with the filmmakers' approach, participated in a Q&A with Winterbottom and Whitecross.

The Killer Inside Me
Winterbottom's film of Jim Thompson's 1952 noir novel, starring Casey Affleck, Kate Hudson and Jessica Alba is a period film which follows a small town Texas sheriff (Affleck), who is also a psychotic killer, through his descent into complete madness. It premiered at the 2010 Sundance Film Festival and caused controversy for the realistic brutality of its violence toward women. In his defence, Winterbottom said, "It's not the real world. It's kind of a parallel version of the real world... I was taken in by that world."

The Trip
This improvised six-episode comedy series, filmed in the English Lake District and written and directed by Winterbottom, stars Steve Coogan and Rob Brydon as the semi-fictionalized versions of themselves they previously played in A Cock and Bull Story. Coogan, an actor unhappy with his career, agrees to write a series of restaurant reviews for The Observer in order to impress his girlfriend Misha (Margo Stilley). As the series opens, she has dumped him and he invites Brydon to take her place on the holiday. Each episode of the series takes place largely over a different gourmet meal, the restaurant names giving each episode their title. The episodes were edited down into a feature film for the US market, which premiered at the Toronto International Film Festival in September 2010, while the full series aired on BBC Two starting in November 2010.

Trishna
Winterbottom's modern retelling of Tess of the d'Urbervilles is his third Thomas Hardy film. It stars Riz Ahmed and Freida Pinto and was shot in Jaipur and Mumbai, India in early 2011. It premiered at the Toronto International Film Festival on 9 September 2011. It was released in the UK on 9 March 2012 and in the US on 13 July.

Everyday
Known during its lengthy production variously as  Seven Days and then Here and There, the film stars John Simm as a man imprisoned for drug-smuggling and charts his relationship with his wife, played by Shirley Henderson. Written by Winterbottom and Laurence Coriat, the film was shot a few weeks at a time over a five-year period from 2007–2012 to reflect the protagonist's time in prison and achieve an authentic aging process. Everyday premiered at the Telluride Film Festival on 3 September 2012, and then screened at the Toronto International Film Festival on 8 September 2012. The film was produced by Britain's Channel 4 and premiered in the UK on television on 15 November 2012, later released theatrically on 18 January 2013. At the Stockholm International Film Festival in November, the film was awarded the FIPRESCI-Award.

The Look of Love
The Look of Love, originally announced as The King of Soho until that title had to be dropped due to a legal dispute, is a biography of famed British pornographer/strip club owner/real estate entrepreneur Paul Raymond which reteams Winterbottom with Steve Coogan, who plays Raymond. The film costars Imogen Poots, Anna Friel and Tamsin Egerton and was written by Matt Greenhalgh. It was released in the UK on 26 April 2013.

The Trip To Italy
Winterbottom filmed a second series of the hit BBC show in the summer of 2013, this time taking Coogan and Brydon on a culinary driving tour through Italy. It follows the route of the Romantics – Percy Bysshe Shelley, Lord Byron and John Keats. Like the first series, IFC Films distributed it in the US as a shorter feature-length film, which premiered at the Sundance Film Festival in January 2014. The full series aired on BBC Two in April 2014.

The Face of an Angel
Winterbottom returned to Italy in November 2013 to shoot The Face of an Angel, starring Daniel Brühl, Kate Beckinsale, and Cara Delevingne. The film was written by Paul Viragh and was inspired partly by the book Angel Face by Barbie Latza Nadeau, about the dramatic, headline-making trial, conviction and eventual acquittal of American student Amanda Knox for the murder of her British roommate Meredith Kercher. However, the film is not about the actual Knox case, but offers a fictionalized version of it, focusing instead on a filmmaker (Brühl) who becomes obsessed with the case. Winterbottom traveled to Perugia, Italy in 2010 and attended court hearings in the Knox case for research on the project. He said at the time that the film would be fictionalized and focus on journalists and the media circus surrounding the trial more than on the actual events in dispute. The film premiered at the 2014 Toronto International Film Festival.

The Emperor's New Clothes
Winterbottom began shooting this documentary in October 2014. The film, hosted by comedian Russell Brand, looks at the financial crisis of 2007–2008 and global economic inequality. It premiered in London on 21 April 2015, followed by its international premiere on 24 April 2015 at the Tribeca Film Festival.

On the Road
The film follows the British band Wolf Alice, focusing on two fictional members of the band's crew, played by Leah Harvey and James McArdle, while the band is on tour. It premiered on 9 October 2016 at the BFI London Film Festival.

The Trip to Spain
Winterbottom reunited with Coogan and Brydon for a third six-episode series in which the duo travel through Spain, visiting Cantabria, the Basque region, Aragon, La Rioja, Castile-La Mancha and Andalusia. The series began filming in September 2016 As with the previous instalments, it premiered on 6 April 2017 as a 6-part weekly TV series on Sky Atlantic, and as a shorter feature film on 22 April 2017 at the Tribeca Film Festival. The film was released in the US on 11 August 2017.

The Wedding Guest
This thriller follows a mysterious young British Muslim man who travels to Pakistan to kidnap a young woman on the eve of her arranged marriage. It stars Dev Patel and Radhika Apte and started filming in Jaipur, India and other locations in Rajasthan in February 2018. It premiered at the Toronto International Film Festival on 8 September 2018.

Greed
Greed is a comedy satirizing the lives of the ultra-rich, starring Steve Coogan as a fictional retail fashion magnate, Isla Fisher as his wife, and David Mitchell as a journalist hired to write the billionaire's life story. The film is set at the billionaire's disastrous 60th birthday party on Mykonos, and explores the divide between the character's wealth and the abject poverty of the workers who produce his products. The project was previously set to star Sacha Baron Cohen. Winterbottom completed photography in December 2018. The film premiered at the Toronto International Film Festival on 7 September 2019.

The Trip to Greece
Coogan and Brydon announced in January 2019 that they would reunite with Winterbottom for a fourth series of their popular programme, set in Greece. Filming began on 12 June 2019. It premiered on 3 March 2020 as a 6-part weekly TV series on SkyOne. It was again edited down into a feature film in the US, whose planned theatrical release by IFC Films in summer 2020 was cancelled due to the COVID-19 pandemic. It premiered with a digital and on demand release on 22 May 2020.

Isolation
This documentary feature, originally announced under the title Europe C-19,  contains five 15-minute segments from directors across Europe, with Winterbottom handling the UK portion. Winterbottom began filming his portion of this film on 5 September 2020. The other portions were directed by Julia von Heinz (Germany), Fernando León de Aranoa (Spain), Jaco Van Dormael (Belgium), and Michele Placido (Italy). The film premiered in September 2021 at the 78th Venice International Film Festival.

Eleven Days in May
Winterbottom co-directed the 2022 documentary Eleven Days in May. The film focuses on the deaths of over 60 Palestinian children who were killed by Israel during its bombing of Gaza over an eleven day period in May 2021. Gaza-based film-maker Mohammed Sawwaf was the other director and Kate Winslet provided the narration.

David Rose wrote a critical article about the film for The Jewish Chronicle. Rose wrote that the film "fails to include criticism made of Hamas for launching rockets from heavily populated areas of Gaza - effectively turning the civilian population into a human shield" and fails to mention the 13 Israelis, including two children, who were killed by rockets fired from Gaza.

This England
This 6-part TV miniseries focuses on Boris Johnson's leadership of Britain, starting with his appointment as prime minister and continuing through the COVID-19 pandemic, when Johnson caught the virus and became critically ill, while his partner gave birth to their son, and Britain suffered among the worst death tolls in the world. Kenneth Branagh stars as Johnson, with Ophelia Lovibond as Carrie Symonds and Simon Paisley Day as Dominic Cummings. Originally titled This Sceptred Isle, Winterbottom was set to direct every episode of the miniseries, which he co-wrote with Kieron Quirke. However, after filming began in February 2021, Winterbottom stepped down from directing in March, reportedly due to health issues. The miniseries was broadcast on Sky on 28 September 2022.

Promised Land
His next project is the political thriller Promised Land, set in 1930s/1940s British Mandatory Palestine. It stars Douglas Booth, Harry Melling and Irina Starshenbaum. The project has been in development for many years. In 2010, Jim Sturgess, Colin Firth and Matthew Macfadyen were announced as its stars. Sturgess and Macfadyen were to play two British police officers hunting Zionist militant Avraham Stern, while Firth would play an official of the British Mandate government. The screenplay was written by Winterbottom and Laurence Coriat. Although the film never entered production in 2010, Winterbottom did shoot documentary footage in Israel with surviving participants in the events. Filming began in October 2021 in the town of Ostuni in Italy, which doubled for Tel Aviv.

Potential future projects

Unmade projects

Untitled Syria Project
In 2017, it was announced that Winterbottom was developing a 10-part TV series with Annapurna Pictures about the war in Syria, focusing on the involvement of foreign journalists and Non-governmental organizations. He first announced in May 2017 that he was researching the project.

The Vatican Connection
Winterbottom was attached in May 2014 to direct a feature adaptation of Richard Hammer's 1982 book The Vatican Connection, the true story of how NYPD detective Joe Coffey uncovered connections between the Vatican and the Mafia while investigating a local New York mobster, leading to a global investigation. It was to be written by Paul Viragh, based on an earlier script by Alessandro Camon.

The Longest Cocktail Party
Winterbottom was attached in October 2011 to direct an adaption of Richard DiLello's 1973 book, The Longest Cocktail Party. It was to tell the story of Apple Corps, the record company formed by The Beatles in 1968. It was to follow the company and its staff, including DiLello and Derek Taylor, from 1968 to its closure in 1970, when The Beatles split. The book was set to be adapted by Jesse Armstrong and co-produced by Andrew Eaton and Liam Gallagher.

Bailout
Winterbottom was attached in May 2011 to direct this adaptation of author Jess Walter's novel The Financial Lives of the Poets, which Walter adapted for the screen. Set to star Jack Black, the film was to follow a man who loses his job and must keep his family afloat by working as a pot dealer.

Books

Dark Matter: Independent Filmmaking in the 21st Century
In 2021, Winterbottom published a book about the workings of the British independent film industry, based on his own experience over his career, and interviews with 15 other major British directors: Paweł Pawlikowski, Danny Boyle, Joanna Hogg, Asif Kapadia, James Marsh, Andrew Haigh, Carol Morley, Edgar Wright, Steve McQueen, Lynne Ramsay, Stephen Daldry, Ben Wheatley, Peter Strickland, Mike Leigh and Ken Loach.

Personal life
Winterbottom was married to Sabrina Broadbent, with whom he has two daughters. After their divorce, Broadbent wrote her debut novel, Descent: An Irresistible Tragicomedy of Everyday Life, a roman à clef about their marriage.

Winterbottom is an atheist.

Filmography

Rosie the Great (1989, TV)
Forget About Me (1990, TV)
Under the Sun (1992, TV)
Love Lies Bleeding (1993, TV)
Family (1994, TV)
Butterfly Kiss (1995)
Go Now (1995)
Jude (1996)
Welcome to Sarajevo (1997)
I Want You (1998)
Wonderland (1999)
With or Without You (1999)
The Claim (2000)
24 Hour Party People (2002)
In This World (2002)
Code 46 (2003)
9 Songs (2004)
A Cock and Bull Story (2005)
The Road to Guantanamo (2006)
A Mighty Heart (2007)
Genova (2008)
The Shock Doctrine (2009)
The Killer Inside Me (2010)
The Trip (2010, TV)
Trishna (2011)
Everyday (2012)
The Look of Love (2013)
The Trip to Italy (2014, TV)
The Face of an Angel (2014)
The Emperor's New Clothes (2015)
On the Road (2016)
The Trip to Spain (2017)
The Wedding Guest (2018)
Greed (2019)
The Trip to Greece (2020)

References

External links

Critical essay by Deborah Allison SensesOfCinema.com
Resonance FM radio interview – "Reality Check: Michael Winterbottom's Code 46" – PanelBorders.Wordpress.com

1961 births
Living people
Alumni of Balliol College, Oxford
Alumni of the University of Bristol
Directors of Golden Bear winners
Filmmakers who won the Best Foreign Language Film BAFTA Award
Silver Bear for Best Director recipients
English film directors
People educated at Queen Elizabeth's Grammar School, Blackburn
People from Blackburn